Farzad Sepahvand (born 15 July 1986) is a Paralympian athlete from Iran competing mainly in F44 classification throwing events.

Athletics history
Sepahvand took up athletics in 2004 at the age 18. He was first selected for the Iran national team at the 2008 Summer Paralympics in Beijing, entering the discus throw event in the F44 classification. He finished just outside the medal positions in fourth place. Four years later he won his first Paralympic medal, taking bronze in the discus throw at the 2012 Games in London. As well as Paralympic success, Sepahvand has won medals at both the World Championships and Asian Para Games.

Personal history
Sepahvand was born in Khorramabad, Iran in 1986.

Notes

Paralympic athletes of Iran
Athletes (track and field) at the 2008 Summer Paralympics
Athletes (track and field) at the 2012 Summer Paralympics
Paralympic bronze medalists for Iran
Living people
Medalists at the 2012 Summer Paralympics
Iranian male discus throwers
People from Khorramabad
1986 births
Paralympic medalists in athletics (track and field)
21st-century Iranian people
Medalists at the 2010 Asian Para Games
Medalists at the 2014 Asian Para Games
Medalists at the 2018 Asian Para Games